The Jackson County Courthouse, located at 1001 Walnut St. in Murphysboro, is the county courthouse serving Jackson County, Illinois. Built in 1927, the courthouse was the fourth built by the county and the third in Murphysboro. Architect Nelson Strong Spencer designed the courthouse in a mix of the Classical Revival and Beaux-Arts styles. The front entrance features a pediment and entablature supported by four columns, all designed according to the Doric order. A parapet and a terrace with balustrades along the sides, both among the building's prominent Beaux-Arts elements, line the roof. In addition to its government functions, the courthouse has hosted large community events and serves as the focal point of downtown Murphysboro.

The courthouse was added to the National Register of Historic Places on December 29, 2015.

References

County courthouses in Illinois
Courthouses on the National Register of Historic Places in Illinois
Buildings and structures in Jackson County, Illinois
Neoclassical architecture in Illinois
Beaux-Arts architecture in Illinois
Government buildings completed in 1927
National Register of Historic Places in Jackson County, Illinois